Yamato Takeru may refer to:
Yamato Takeru (c. 72 – 114), a Japanese legendary prince of the Yamato dynasty, son of Keikō of Yamato
Yamato Takeru (TV series), an anime loosely related to the legend about a young boy who goes onto a great adventure
Yamato Takeru (film), a 1994 Japanese film (known as Orochi the Eight Headed Dragon in the U.S.)